The 2010 German Athletics Championships were held at the Eintracht-Stadion in Braunschweig on 17–18 July 2010.

Results

Men

Women

References 

 Results source:

External links 
 Official website of the German Athletics Championships 

2010
German Athletics Championships
German Athletics Championships
German Athletics Championships